Roces is an Italian company established in 1952. The headquarters is in the municipality of Montebelluna, Italy.

Today Roces is a world leader in the design and production of inline and ice skates.

In 2006 the company launched IDEA, the first size adjustable ski boot for children ever designed.

Aggressive skating
Roller skating
Roller skates
Roller skating equipment
Sporting goods manufacturers of Italy
Italian brands